The Big Tignish Light is a lighthouse on Prince Edward Island, Canada. It was built in 1881 but was deactivated in 1997. The unused lighthouse began to fall into disrepair, but it was relocated to the Fisherman's Haven Community Park in 2009, where it was renovated and repainted.

Keepers 
Isidore Chasson 1877-1881 
Isidore Gaudet 1881-1894 
J.S Richard 1894–1895 
Fidele J. Gaudet 1895–1897 
Agate Gaudet 1897–1912 
D. Handrahan 1912–? 
Jerome J. Perry 1923–1956 
Alphonse Gaudet 1956–1962

See also
List of lighthouses in Prince Edward Island
 List of lighthouses in Canada

References

External links
Picture of Big Tignish Light
 Aids to Navigation Canadian Coast Guard

Lighthouses in Prince Edward Island
Lighthouses completed in 1881
1881 establishments in Canada